Jerome Dove (October 3, 1953 – August 2, 2019) was an American football defensive back in the National Football League (NFL) who played for the San Diego Chargers. He played college football for the Colorado State Rams.

References

1953 births
2019 deaths
American football defensive backs
San Diego Chargers players
Colorado State Rams football players

2.  “Jerome Dove death”

3. "Jerome Dove Obituary"